Ózd Subregion Borsod-Abaúj-Zemplén second largest of the subregions of Hungary. Area : 548,39 km². Population : 69 400 (2009)

Settlements
 Arló
 Bánréve
 Borsodbóta
 Borsodnádasd
 Borsodszentgyörgy
 Bükkmogyorósd
 Csernely
 Csokvaomány
 Domaháza
 Dubicsány
 Farkaslyuk
 Gömörszőlős
 Hangony
 Hét
 Járdánháza
 Kelemér
 Királd
 Kissikátor
 Lénárddaróc
 Nekézseny
 Ózd
 Putnok
 Sajómercse
 Sajónémeti
 Sajópüspöki
 Sajóvelezd
 Sáta
 Serényfalva
 Uppony

See also
Ózd District (from 2013)

References

Subregions of Hungary